This is a list of the seasons played by VfB Stuttgart from 1909 when the club replaced the rugby club. In 1909 they joined the South German Football Association playing the second tier B-klasse. Because there is very little information about these leagues this list starts from 1912 when Stuttgart eventually advanced to the senior Südkreis-Liga. The club's achievements in all major national and international competitions as well as the top scorers are listed. The list is separated into three parts, coinciding with the three major episodes of German football:

Before 1945 the German league structure was changing rapidly. The end of World War II marks the end of this episode.
From 1945–63 a German league structure without a nationwide league was maintained without greater changes.
Since 1963 a nationwide league, the Bundesliga, exists.

VfB Stuttgart have won the German football championship five times; two before and three after the establishment of the Bundesliga. The club also won the DFB-Pokal three times and the DFL-Supercup once.

The club have been relegated three times from the Bundesliga, in 1975, 2016 and 2019. In 1977, 2017 and 2020, the club was promoted back to first division football.

Key

Key to league record:
Pld – Matches played
W – Matches won
D – Matches drawn
L – Matches lost
GF – Goals for
GA – Goals against
Pts – Points
Pos – Final position

Key to rounds:
Prel. – Preliminary round
QR1 – First qualifying round
QR2 – Second qualifying round, etc.
Inter – Intermediate round (between qualifying rounds and rounds proper)
GS – Group stage
1R – First round
2R – Second round, etc.
R64 – 1/32 Final
R32 – 1/16 Final
R16 – 1/8 Final
QF – Quarter-finals
SF – Semi-finals
F – Final
W – Winners
DNE – Did not enter

BL – Bundesliga
2BL – 2. Bundesliga
SGFC – South German Football Championship

Seasons until 1933

Results of league competitions by season.

Gauliga (1933–1945)

1945–1963

Since 1963 (foundation of Bundesliga)

Literature

References 

VfB Stuttgart
Vfb Stuttgart
German football club statistics